Paul Colin (15 May 1920 – 20 March 2018) was a French novelist who received the Prix Goncourt in 1950 for Les jeux sauvages. Colin died in March 2018 at the age of 98.

Works
Les jeux sauvages, Éditions Gallimard, Paris, 1950. Translated into English as Savage Play, Dutton, New York, 1953
Terre paradis, Gallimard, 1959

References

1920 births
2018 deaths
20th-century French novelists
20th-century French male writers
French male novelists
Prix Goncourt winners
People from Sens